Feby Eka Putra (born 12 February 1999) is an Indonesian professional footballer who plays as a winger or midfielder for Liga 1 club Dewa United.

Club career

Bali United
On 4 December 2017, Feby signed a four-year contract with Liga 1 club Bali United on a free transfer, along with his national teammate Hanis Saghara Putra. The Coach Widodo Cahyono Putro welcomed the positive arrival of the two players. Hanis and Feby are expected to seize the opportunity well to the professional level, He said "As a former Indonesia national team player, I strongly support the program of Bali United to foster young players to the professional level".

TIRA-Persikabo (loan)
He was signed for TIRA-Persikabo to play in the 2019 Liga 1 (Indonesia), on loan from Bali United.

Persija Jakarta
He was signed for Persija Jakarta to play in Liga 1 in the 2019 season. Feby made his league debut on 22 June 2019 in a match against Persela Lamongan at the Surajaya Stadium, Lamongan.

Arema
He was signed for Arema to play in the 2020 Liga 1, on loan from Persija Jakarta. This season was suspended on 27 March 2020 due to the COVID-19 pandemic. The season was abandoned and was declared void on 20 January 2021.

He made his move to Arema permanent on 10 June 2021, Family factors made him move to Malang, so he could take care of his sick mother in Mojokerto. He made his 2021–22 season league debut in a 1–1 draw against PSM Makassar on 5 September 2021.

Dewa United
Feby was signed for Dewa United to play in Liga 1 in the 2022–23 season. He made his league debut on 25 July 2022 in a match against Persis Solo at the Moch. Soebroto Stadium, Magelang.

International career
Feby made his International debut on 31 May 2017 in the 2017 Toulon Tournament against Brazil U-20 with a 0–1 defeat. He scored his first International goal and hattrick at 2017 AFF U-18 Youth Championship in a 9–0 win against Philippines U-19.

Honours

International 
Indonesia U19
 AFF U-19 Youth Championship third place: 2017, 2018
Indonesia U23
 Southeast Asian Games  Silver medal: 2019

References

External links
Feby Eka Putra at Soccerway

1999 births
Living people
Indonesian footballers
People from Sidoarjo Regency
Sportspeople from East Java
Bali United F.C. players
Persikabo 1973 players
Persija Jakarta players
Arema F.C. players
Dewa United F.C. players
Liga 1 (Indonesia) players
Indonesia youth international footballers
Association football midfielders
Competitors at the 2019 Southeast Asian Games
Southeast Asian Games silver medalists for Indonesia
Southeast Asian Games medalists in football